Nok Air (derived from nok (นก), the Thai word for bird) is a  low-cost airline in Thailand operating mostly domestic services out of Bangkok's Don Mueang International Airport. Thai Airways International owns the fourth-largest stake in the airline.

History 
Nok Air was established in February 2004 under Sky Asia Co., Ltd. and started operations on 23 July 2004. As of March 2007, it had 130 employees and had reached around 1,400 employees by 2014. Nok Air began its first international service on 31 May 2007, with daily flights to Bangalore, India, but suspended these flights in 2020.

Nok Air serves the largest number of domestic routes within Thailand, with 24 routes.

Nok Air operates largely independently from Thai Airways, which has caused some friction between the two companies. To gain greater control of Nok Air, Thai Airways has tried to purchase the shares of other shareholders, notably Krung Thai Bank. Although Thai Airways and Krung Thai Bank are both state enterprises under the control of the finance ministry, Krung Thai Bank refused to sell its shares in Nok Air to Thai Airways. The purchase would have lifted Thai Airways' stake in Nok Air from 39 to 49%. Evidence of Thai Airways declining interest in Nok Air came in May 2017, when Thai Airways shareholding was diluted to 21.57% as a result of not taking up their entitlement of a new share offering. As a consequence Thai investor, Mr. Nuttapol Chulangkul became the airline's largest shareholder, owning 23.77% of the company.

Due to the preparation process to be listed in the Stock Exchange of Thailand (SET), the company name had been changed to "Nok Airlines Company Limited" on 16 January 2006. Then, at its initial entry to Thailand's stock market, it was  renamed "Nok Airlines Public Company Limited" (since 18 January 2013) with trading symbol "NOK".

In late 2013, Nok Air announced a joint venture with Scoot Airlines (a low-cost subsidiary of Singapore Airlines) to form NokScoot, a low-cost airline operating medium to long-haul international services, based out of Don Mueang Airport in Bangkok. The joint venture was shut down in 2020 as a result of the COVID-19 pandemic.

A new company slogan, "Smiling Across Asia" was unveiled in June 2016. It hints at Nok's strategy of becoming the dominant regional carrier.

On December 22, 2017, Mr. Patee Sarasin, the first Nok Air CEO (between 2004 and 2017), resigned from the company's board of directors.

Turbulence in 2016
In February 2016, Nok Air cancelled numerous flights and issued several contradictory stories to explain the cancellations. On 14 February 2016, a work stoppage was caused by about 10 pilots, which was followed by the resignation of 17 pilots. On 25 February, several flight cancellations were announced, resulting in a loss of trust from the airline's customers.

There are issues of dissension between Nok Air management and cockpit staff, charges of nepotism, and questions about pilot loyalty.  In its 2015 financial report released on 26 February, the airline acknowledged that the turnover of cockpit staff had exceeded the normal rate, well beyond expectations. There are just under 200 pilots working at Nok Air, considered too few for the scale of its operations.

The problem arose after Thailand tightened its aviation standards to comply with the European Aviation Safety Agency, disqualifying some pilots, Patee Sarasin, Nok Air CEO at that time, told local media. Thailand is under pressure to improve its aviation standards after US authorities downgraded the country's aviation safety rating in December 2015.

To remedy its shortage of pilots, Nok may be permitted to boost the number of its foreign pilots beyond the 40 percent cap mandated by Thai law according to Transport Minister Arkhom Termpittayapaisith. The 40 percent pilot quota is set by the Civil Aviation Authority of Thailand (CAAT), which aims to encourage airlines to employ more Thais as pilots. Pilots, according to the Labour Ministry, are on the list of 39 jobs where Thai nationals are preferred, jobs ranging from barbers and secretaries to certain fields of engineering. Nok in February hired 32 new pilots, bringing their total to 212.

On 30 July 2020, Nok Air filed for bankruptcy.

Destinations

Miscellaneous
Nok Air also offers ferry services to domestic island destinations as well as domestic and cross border coach services to Vientiane and Pakse in Laos in conjunction with other tour operators.

Fleet

, Nok Air operates the following aircraft, most are leased:

Major shareholders

Partnerships 
Nok Air has signed a long-term partnership with Sabre and its subsidiary company, Radixx, selecting an extensive suite of products from Sabre and Radixx to expand its distribution and revenue generation opportunities.

See also

 NokScoot
 Nok Mini

References

External links

Official Nok Holidays website

2004 establishments in Thailand
Airlines established in 2004
Airlines of Thailand
Low-cost carriers
Value Alliance
Thai Airways International
Companies listed on the Stock Exchange of Thailand